Malus kansuensis is a species in the genus Malus in the family Rosaceae, called with the common name Calva crabapple. A tree of this variety would produce a yellow fruit in the size a half an inch. The white flowers are about 2 inches across.

References

kansuensis
Crabapples